Johannes Gaspar Scheuchzer (1684 -1738) was a Swiss botanist and plant collector. He was the brother of Swiss scholar Johann Jakob Scheuchzer, both of whom are the namesake of the genus Scheuchzeria.

References

1684 births
1738 deaths
Pre-Linnaean botanists